Lyudmila Fedotova (born 23 April 1986) is a female skier from Kazakhstan. She competed in the alpine skiing events in the 2010 Winter Olympics. She also competed in the FIS Alpine World Ski Championships 2009.

Fedotova competed in the women's downhill, super-G and giant slalom coming 36th and 38th in the first two, but failing to finish in the giant slalom.

Results
FIS Alpine World Ski Championships 2009:Super-G–50Giant Slalom–DNF2010 Winter Olympics: Downhill–36Super-G–38

References

External links
Lyudmila Fedotova at www.vancouver2010.com

1986 births
Kazakhstani female alpine skiers
Alpine skiers at the 2010 Winter Olympics
Olympic alpine skiers of Kazakhstan
Living people
Asian Games medalists in alpine skiing
Alpine skiers at the 2003 Asian Winter Games
Alpine skiers at the 2007 Asian Winter Games
Alpine skiers at the 2011 Asian Winter Games
Asian Games gold medalists for Kazakhstan
Asian Games silver medalists for Kazakhstan
Medalists at the 2011 Asian Winter Games